The Naked Ghost, Burp! and Blue Jam is a miniature collection of short stories by Australian author Paul Jennings. It was released in 1991 and is part of the Clipper Fiction series.

The Naked Ghost
A boy goes down a well, believing a legend about a boy who went missing there many years ago. When he enters the room at the bottom of the well, he is attacked by the boy from the legend – who is alive, corporeal, but naked and invisible (a "naked ghost"). The naked ghost steals the boy's clothes, which causes the pair to trade places: the naked ghost becomes visible and escapes, while the boy becomes the new "naked ghost", and is left trapped in the room at the bottom of the well.

The boy remains trapped alone in the room for 50 years. Eventually, another boy ventures into the well; the naked ghost steals his clothes and escapes, exactly as had been done to him before. Once he returns to civilization, he finds the new technology strange; for example, he refers to a TV as "a box with moving pictures that talk".

Burp!
A boy buys junk food from the school canteen every day. His teacher gets annoyed, as does one of his classmates. When he moves to a new house, he finds a spellbook. One of the spells allows him to pass his obesity to others. Every day, he eats enough junk food to make him sick, and whenever someone insults him, he casts the spell on them. However, all the weight that was passed on to others is regained all at once at the end of four years; the boy rapidly expands to enormous size and dies of heart failure.

Peppi, the ice-cream man from the Unreal story Smart Ice-Cream, makes a cameo appearance.

Blue Jam
A man who lives in an opal-mining town makes a living by selling jam. One day, he buys an enchanted plum tree that grows very quickly, produces fruit even during winter, and tries to strangle him whenever he picks its fruit. However, he makes the plums into jam that the whole town becomes obsessed with. The jam has hallucinogenic effects, causing people to see the man as a jar of jam and attempt to eat him.

1991 short story collections
Australian short story collections
Australian children's books
Books by Paul Jennings (Australian author)
1991 children's books
Children's short story collections